Rami Al-Deeb  (born 14 June 1977) he is a retired athlete who competed internationally for Palestine.

He represented Palestine at the 2000 Summer Olympics in Sydney. He competed in the 20 kilometre walk where he finished 44th, he was also the flag bearer for his country.

References

1977 births
Living people
Athletes (track and field) at the 2000 Summer Olympics
Olympic athletes of Palestine
Palestinian racewalkers
Palestinian male athletes
Male racewalkers
Athletes (track and field) at the 1998 Asian Games
Asian Games competitors for Palestine